Cherry Plain, also spelled Cherryplain, is a hamlet in eastern Rensselaer County, New York, United States.  It comprises the ZIP code of 12040.

It is located east of Troy, New York, in the town of Berlin, New York.  Cherry Plain is located within the Berlin Central School District.  Berlin Central Junior-Senior High School is the secondary school in Cherry Plain.

It is bisected by New York State Route 22.

Important businesses and sights
 Cherry Plain State Park

References

Hamlets in Rensselaer County, New York